Ascodichaena is a genus of fungi in the family Ascodichaenaceae. The genus was circumscribed in 1977.

References

Leotiomycetes
Leotiomycetes genera
Taxa described in 1977